Tel al-Hawa ("Hill of the Wind") or Tel al-Islam ("Hill of Islam") is a neighborhood in the southern part of the Palestinian city of Gaza. Founded by the Palestinian National Authority in the late 1990s, Tel al-Hawa is one of the more affluent areas of the city. It contains the Islamic University in Gaza and the Interior Ministry of the Palestinian National Authority. 

Tel al-Hawa was formerly the headquarters of the Preventive Security Service, until Hamas took over the Gaza Strip in 2007 and turned it into a police station. After capturing the neighborhood, Hamas militiamen had it renamed to "Tel al-Islam". The Doghmush family held journalist Alan Johnston in Tel al-Hawa until Hamas secured his release. The neighborhood was severely damaged in the Gaza War, codenamed "Operation Cast Lead" by Israel. It was the scene of some of the fiercest fighting of the war.  Dozens of Hamas fighters were killed or wounded, and a number of IDF soldiers were also wounded. 12 civilians were also killed.

References

Neighborhoods of Gaza City
Upper class